Jerzy Dabrowski competed for Poland in the men's standing volleyball event at the 1988 Summer Paralympics, where he won a bronze medal.

He also competed in para athletics events at multiple Summer Paralympics:
 In athletics at the 1980 Summer Paralympics, he competed in the E classification, winning a gold medal in the men's javelin throw, silver medals in discus throw and shot put, and a bronze medal in the long jump, and placed fourth in the 100 m.
 In athletics at the 1988 Summer Paralympics he competed in the A6/A8/A9/L6 classification, winning gold medals in the men's shot put and discus throw and a silver medal in javelin throw.
 In athletics at the 1992 Summer Paralympics he competed in the THS4 classification, winning gold medals in the men's shot put and discus throw and a silver medal in javelin throw.
 In athletics at the 1996 Summer Paralympics he competed in the F46 classification, winning gold medals in the men's shot put and discus throw and placing sixth in javelin throw.
 In athletics at the 2000 Summer Paralympics he competed in the F46 classification, placing sixth in javelin throw.

See also 
 Poland at the 1980 Summer Paralympics
 Poland at the 1988 Summer Paralympics
 Poland at the 1992 Summer Paralympics
 Poland at the 1996 Summer Paralympics
 Poland at the 2000 Summer Paralympics

References 

Living people
Year of birth missing (living people)
Place of birth missing (living people)
Polish male javelin throwers
Polish male discus throwers
Polish male long jumpers
Polish male shot putters
Polish men's volleyball players
Paralympic gold medalists for Poland
Paralympic silver medalists for Poland
Paralympic bronze medalists for Poland
Paralympic medalists in athletics (track and field)
Paralympic medalists in volleyball
Athletes (track and field) at the 1980 Summer Paralympics
Athletes (track and field) at the 1988 Summer Paralympics
Athletes (track and field) at the 1992 Summer Paralympics
Athletes (track and field) at the 1996 Summer Paralympics
Athletes (track and field) at the 2000 Summer Paralympics
Volleyball players at the 1988 Summer Paralympics
Medalists at the 1980 Summer Paralympics
Medalists at the 1988 Summer Paralympics
Medalists at the 1992 Summer Paralympics
Medalists at the 1996 Summer Paralympics
Paralympic volleyball players of Poland
Javelin throwers with limb difference
Discus throwers with limb difference
Long jumpers with limb difference
Shot putters with limb difference
Paralympic javelin throwers
Paralympic discus throwers
Paralympic long jumpers
Paralympic shot putters
21st-century Polish people
20th-century Polish people